Uttar Bihar Gramin Bank is a regional rural bank (RRB) in the State of Bihar, India. It is under the ownership of Ministry of Finance, Government of India. It is one of the largest regional rural banks in India in terms of branch network, staff strength and area of operation.

The bank was created from the amalgamation of Uttar Bihar Kshetriya Gramin Bank and Kosi Kshetriya Gramin Bank(transferor regional rural banks) by Government of India in 1976 as per Gazette Notification issued by the Indian Ministry of Finance under Sub-Section (1) of Section 23 A of the Regional Rural Bank Act, 1976 (21 of 1976). It is sponsored by Central Bank of India in the state of Bihar as a single regional rural bank. The bank is headquartered in Muzaffarpur.

The current Chairman is Shri Sohail Ahmad.

Regional office
The bank has 14 regional offices.
 
 Araria, ADB Chowk, Araria.
 Bettiah, Station Bazar Chowk, Supriya Cinema Road,  Bettiah.
 Chapra, Dahiyavan, Chapra.
 Darbhanga, Devendra Lok, Lahriasarai, Dharbhanga.
 Gopalganj, Vaibhav Hotel Complex, Gopalganj.
 Hajipur, Ramashish Chowk, Hajipur.
 Jhanjharpur, Kranti Bhavan, Jhanjharpur, Madhubani.
 Madhubani, Parishad Bazar, Madhubani.
 Motihari,Narayan complex,Balua Tal, Motihari.
 Muzaffarpur, Ramrekha complex, Muzaffarpur.
 Purnia, Sri Nagar Hata, Purnia.
 Saharsa, D. B. Road, Saharsa.
 Sitamarhi, Dumra Road, Sitamarhi.
 Siwan, Rajwansi Nagar, Siwan.

Areas of operation
The Uttar Gramin Regional Bank functions through a network of 1032 branches in 18 districts in the State of Bihar.

 Araria
 Darbhanga
 East Champaran
 Gopalganj
 Katihar
 Kishanganj
 Madhepura
 Madhubani
 Muzaffarpur
 Purnea
 Saharsa
 Saran
 Sheohar
 Sitamarhi
 Siwan
 Supaul
 West Champaran
 Vaishali

Uttar Bihar Gramin Bank: IFSC:CBIN0R10001

Award
The bank was awarded for the best performance in banking linkage of self-help groups (SHGs) in the Regional Rural category, at the state credit seminar organized by National Bank for Agriculture and Rural Development (Nabard).

Recruitment
Bank recruits officials through the common written examination (CWE) hosted by Institute of Banking Personal Selection (IBPS) every year.

See also

 Banking in India
 List of banks in India
 Reserve Bank of India
 Regional Rural Bank
 Indian Financial System Code
 List of largest banks
 List of companies of India
 Make in India

References

External links
 State Level Banker's Committee of Bihar
 Financial inclusion plan for 40 banks

Regional rural banks of India
Companies based in Bihar
Muzaffarpur
1976 establishments in Bihar
Banks established in 1976
Indian companies established in 1976